Erwin Jan Feuchtmann Pérez is a Chilean handballer for Ademar Leon and the Chilean national team.

His siblings Emil, Harald and Inga Feuchtmann are also handballers playing for the Chilean national handball team.

Feuchtmann participated at the 2017 World Men's Handball Championship.

Individual awards
2019 Pan American Games: Top scorer
2022 South and Central American Men's Handball Championship:Top scorer

References

1990 births
Living people
People from Punta Arenas
Chilean male handball players
Chilean people of German descent
Expatriate handball players in Turkey
Chilean expatriate sportspeople in Austria
Chilean expatriate sportspeople in France
Chilean expatriate sportspeople in Germany
Chilean expatriate sportspeople in Romania
Chilean expatriate sportspeople in Turkey
Beşiktaş J.K. Handball Team players
VfL Gummersbach players
Pan American Games medalists in handball
Pan American Games silver medalists for Chile
Pan American Games bronze medalists for Chile
Handball players at the 2011 Pan American Games
Handball players at the 2019 Pan American Games
South American Games bronze medalists for Chile
South American Games medalists in handball
Medalists at the 2019 Pan American Games
Medalists at the 2011 Pan American Games